Dairy farming in New Zealand began from small beginnings during the early days of colonisation by Europeans. The New Zealand dairy industry is based almost exclusively on cattle, with a population of 4.92 million milking cows in the 2019-20 season. The income from dairy farming is now a major part of the New Zealand economy, becoming an NZ$13.4 billion industry by 2017.

History

In 1814 the missionary Samuel Marsden introduced the first Shorthorn dairy cows to the Bay of Islands from New South Wales. From the 1840s, most settlements had farms with some Shorthorn dairy cattle. Herds tended to be larger near urban areas.

The first dairy co-operative was established on Otago Peninsula in 1871. In 1881, the newly arrived colonist William Bowron gave a series of lectures propounding the notion that the institution of dairy factories, for the mass production of cheese, would be greatly advantageous to the economy of New Zealand. He was largely instrumental in the establishment of the Ashburton Cheese and Butter Factory at Flemington. The factory was managed by William Harding, the son of the inventor of modern Cheddar cheese, Joseph Harding. The venture was a great success, and consequently Bowron was appointed Government Inspector of Dairy Factories in 1883. In this capacity, he largely facilitated the setting up of factories across the country until his death in 1890. He published three pamphlets on the manufacture of cheese, butter and bacon in New Zealand.

By 1920, there were 600 dairy processing factories of which about 85% were owned by co-operatives. In 1923, the New Zealand Dairy Board (NZDB) was formed as a statutory board with monopoly control of the export of all New Zealand dairy products. In the 1930s there were around 500 co-operatives but after World War II, improved transportation, processing technologies and energy systems led to a trend of consolidation where the co-operatives merged and became larger and fewer in number. By the late 1990s, there were four co-operatives: the Waikato-based New Zealand Dairy Group, the Taranaki-based Kiwi Co-operative Dairies, the Hokitika-based Westland Milk Products and Tatua Co-operative Dairy Company.

In 1988, due to the effects of Cyclone Bola, many farms in Taranaki converted from agriculture to dairy farming.

In 2001, the Dairy Industry Restructuring Act 2001 was passed, allowing the two largest remaining cooperatives, New Zealand Co-operative Dairy Company Ltd and Kiwi Co-operative Dairies Ltd, to merge with the New Zealand Dairy Board to produce Fonterra, now New Zealand's largest company.

Farm operations 
Dairy farming in New Zealand is primarily pasture-based. Dairy cattle primarily feed on grass, supplemented by silage, hay and other crops during winter and other times of slow pasture growth. Traditional dairy production areas are the wetter areas of the country, including the Waikato, the Bay of Plenty, Taranaki, Manawatū, Nelson, Tasman and the West Coast, but Increase irrigation has seen dairy farms established in drier areas such as Canterbury and Otago.

Around 56% of dairy farms in New Zealand are owner-operated as of 2015, while 29% are operated by sharemilkers and 14% are operated by contract milkers. Herd-owning sharemilkers (formerly 50:50 sharemikers) own their own herd, and are responsible for employing workers and the day-to-day operations of the farm, in return for receiving a percentage (typically 50%) of the milk income. Variable order sharemilkers do not own their own herd, and receive a lower percentage (typically 20-30%) of the milk income, while contract milkers are paid a fixed price per unit of milk.

The dairy farming year in New Zealand typically runs from 1 June to 31 May. The first day of the new year, known as "Moving Day" or "Gypsy Day", sees a large-scale migration as sharemilkers and contract milkers take up new contracts and move herds and equipment between farms. Calving typically takes place in late winter (July and August), and cows are milked for 270 days before being dried off in late autumn (April and May). Some farms, either wholly or partly, employ winter milking, with calving in late summer and early autumn (February and March).

Processing and export

In the 2019-20 season, New Zealand produced  of raw milk containing 1.9 million tonnes of milk solids (protein and milkfat). This makes the country the world's seventh-largest milk producer, with about 3% of world production in the 2016/17 dairy season. Most of this exported, with Fonterra alone responsible for approximately 30% of the world's dairy exports.

Before the advent of refrigerated shipping in the 1880s, dairy production was entirely for local consumption, with butter and cheese usually being produced on the farm, with the surplus being sold to the community via the local store. Small dairy factories began to be established in the 1880s, and soon there was one in almost every village in dairying regions. Production began to be centralised in the second half of the 20th century, with facilities such as the Fonterra plants at Whareroa (near Hāwera), Edendale, Clandeboye (near Timaru), and Te Rapa being the four largest in the Southern Hemisphere. Whareroa is also currently the largest dairy factory in the world by milk intake.

Fonterra is the largest processor of milk in New Zealand, processing 82 percent of all milk solids as of 2018. Other large dairy companies are Open Country Dairy (7.4%), Synlait and Westland Milk Products (3.4% each), Miraka (1.4%), Oceania Dairy (1.1%), and Tatua Co-operative Dairy Company (0.7%).

Pest and diseases

Enzootic bovine leucosis 
Enzootic bovine leucosis is a form of leukaemia caused by the Bovine leukemia virus (BLV). In 1997, a national control scheme was implemented with the goal of eradicating BLV from New Zealand. This was declared successful in 2009

Bovine tuberculosis 
Bovine tuberculosis is currently (2012) endemic in possums across approximately 38 per cent of New Zealand (known as ‘vector risk areas’). In these areas, nearly 70 per cent of new herd infections can be traced back to possums or ferrets. From 1979–1984, possum control was stopped due to lack of funding. In spite of regular and frequent TB testing of cattle herds, the number of infected herds snowballed and continued to increase until 1994, and the area of New Zealand where there were TB wild animals expanded from about 10 to 40 per cent.
The Biosecurity Act 1993, which established a National Pest Management Strategy, is the legislation behind control of the disease in New Zealand. The Animal Health Board (AHB) operates a nationwide programme of cattle testing and possum control with the goal of eradicating the bacterium responsible for bovine tuberculosis (Mycobacterium bovis) from wild vector species across 2.5 million hectares – or one quarter – of New Zealand's at-risk areas by 2026 and, eventually, eradicating the disease entirely. As of the 2017/18 dairy season, only twenty herds in New Zealand remained affected.

Possums are not native to New Zealand, and are considered both an agricultural and a conservation pest. They are controlled through a combination of trapping, ground-baiting and, where other methods are impractical, aerial treatment with 1080 poison.
That possums are such effective transmitters of TB appears to be facilitated by their behaviour once they succumb to the disease. Terminally ill TB possums will show increasingly erratic behaviour, such as venturing out during the daytime to get enough food to eat, and seeking out buildings in which to keep warm. As a consequence they may wander onto paddocks, where they naturally attract the attention of inquisitive cattle and deer. This behaviour has been captured on video.

Mycoplasma Bovis 
Mycoplasma bovis, a bacterial disease known to cause a range of serious conditions in cattle was detected in New Zealand in July 2017. Known conditions include mastitis, pneumonia, arthritis, and late-term abortions. The disease has been described as the worst disease to land in New Zealand, with an eradication cost estimated at $886 million over 10 years.

Leptospirosis 
Leptospirosis is a disease caused by bacteria known as Leptospira and is one of the most common diseases transmitted from animals to humans in New Zealand. The disease is common amongst dairy farmers and the numbers notified are increasing yearly with 141 cases notified in 2017.

Environmental impacts
Dairy farming is being increasingly held to account for the environmental impacts of the industry. Fish and Game started the "dirty dairying" campaign in 2002 to highlight the effect of dairying on water quality. As a response to the campaign the Dairying and Clean Streams Accord was established in an attempt to reduce the level of water pollution. Initially the family owned Crafar Farms bore the brunt of the prosecutions and were labelled the "poster boys for dirty dairying" by Environment Waikato's regulatory committee chairman Ian Balme. Dairy NZ in 2014 claimed that as a direct result of the Sustainable Dairying: Water Accord all New Zealand dairy companies now have programmes in place to assess the effluent systems of suppliers on a three-yearly basis, with several assessing every farm every year. Despite this, a 2018 report from Forest and Bird found that regional councils had 425 reported cases of serious non-compliance in 2016–17, and this was likely a significant under-reporting.

Milk pricing
Dairy farmers are paid by milk processors based on the amount of milk solids (protein and fat) sold. For the 2019-20 season, Fonterra paid farmers $7.14 per kilogram of milk solids (kgMS) excluding GST, with other processors paying between $6.75 and $9.96 per kgMS. Farmers are penalised if they supply milk that fails to meet quality standards, for example, if there is a high somatic cell count or antibiotics are present.

In 2011 controversy arose over the retail price of milk in New Zealand, leading to an enquiry by a government select committee and a small scale price war.

See also
Agriculture in New Zealand
Sharemilking
Crafar Farms

References

Further reading

External links

Te Ara – The Encyclopedia of New Zealand (1966) – Dairy farming
Ministry of Agriculture and Forestry – The New Zealand Dairy Industry
DairyNZ – an industry organisation
South Island Dairying Development Centre – a partnership of six organisations set up to promote dairying in the South Island
godairy.co.nz – an industry promotional website